Hian may refer to:

People
 Chua Wee Hian (born 1939), Singaporean evangelical
 Eng Hian (born 1977)
 Liem Koen Hian (ca 1896-1952), Indonesian journalist and politician
 Sim Kui Hian (born 1965), Malaysian cardiologist
 Tan Swie Hian, Singaporean multidisciplinary artist
 Tay Peng Hian, Singaporean philatelist
 Teng Yu-hsien (1906–1944), Taiwanese Hakka musician

Places
 Hian, Konarak, Iran
 Hian (Swedish river)